Tom Hodson (27 September 1990) is a professional rugby league and rugby union footballer who played in the 2010s.

Club career
Tom Hodson made his début for Featherstone Rovers on Sunday 3 February 2013.

References

External links
Statistics at rugbyleagueproject.org
Defeats for Crusaders and Scorpions
Doncaster RLFC: Returnee Hodson will fit straight in, says Cooke
Huddersfield RU boosted by return of Tom Hodson from Doncaster Dragons
Tom Hodson settles in with Huddersfield RUFC
Huddersfield Rugby Union club disappointed as Tom Hodson opts for move to Otley

1990 births
Living people
Doncaster R.L.F.C. players
English rugby league players
English rugby union players
Featherstone Rovers players
Place of birth missing (living people)
Rugby league wingers
Rugby union wings